Alma Lenore Francis (October 15, 1890  August 21, 1968) was an American dancer, singer, and stage actress. She had an international career as a theatrical actress and operatic soprano in numerous stage productions, as well as a short-lived career in Hollywood, appearing in three feature films during the silent era.

A native of Portland, Oregon, Francis was educated at St. Helens Hall and later studied piano and operatic voice under Abbie Carrington in San Francisco. After completing her studies, Francis found success as a Broadway actress, obtaining lead roles in original productions of the musicals The Pink Lady (1911) and The Little Cafe (1913). She married film actor Robert Gordon in 1919. In the early-1920s, Francis signed a contract with Fox Film Corporation and appeared in three silent films, including a role in The Wolf Man (1924).

After abandoning her film career, Francis appeared in theater productions in California and toured Italy performing as an operatic soprano in various productions before returning to the United States in 1934. Francis spent her later life married to Kenneth Fields, a U.S. forest ranger, and living on a berry farm west of Sandy, Oregon, where she taught singing in her private home studio, and was an advocate of the arts in the Portland metropolitan area. She died on August 21, 1968, aged 77.

Biography

1890–1910: Early life
Alma Lenore Frances was born October 15, 1890 in Portland, Oregon to William and Alma Ray Francis (née Wilson). Both her maternal and paternal ancestors were Scottish pioneers, and her father was a mining engineer originally from Chicago who founded the St. Johns Lumber Company in Portland. She was educated at St. Helens Hall in Portland, and later studied piano in San Francisco under Emlyn Lewys, and operatic voice with Abbie Carrington.

1911–1920: Early stage career
Francis began her career in theater, appearing on Broadway in the chorus line of a Lulu Glaser production. She had her first substantial role as Serpolette Pochet in the original 1911 production of The Pink Lady. She subsequently performed the supporting role of Angele in a Washington, D.C. production of The Pink Lady in December 1911. She also appeared in Glen MacDonough's production of Eva in 1912 (produced by A.L. Erlanger), and in 1913's musical comedy The Little Cafe. A review of Francis's performance in The Little Cafe published in the Brooklyn Eagle was critical of her performance, noting "the kindest thing to say is that she must have been suffering from a severe case of stage fright." In 1917, Francis inherited a substantial fortune from a distant relative in California, and used the money to invest in a fruit ranch in Santa Ana.

In April 1919, it was reported in the Los Angeles Times that Francis had married actor Robert Gordon in March that year in Los Angeles. Francis again made headlines in December 1919 for being one of the first stage actresses in the United States to gain the right to vote. She also performed as a dancer at the Waldorf–Astoria for the Metropolitan Opera Club in the spring of 1920.

1920–1933: Hollywood and Italy
After appearing onstage for numerous years, Francis had a brief career in Hollywood, appearing in several films during the silent era for Fox Film Corporation. Among them were the horror film The Wolf Man (1924), in which she starred opposite John Gilbert and Norma Shearer, and Love Letters (also 1924), co-starring with Shirley Mason. In June 1922, Francis appeared on radio in San Francisco, performing songs from the musical So Long Letty.

After her role in Love Letters, Fox loaned Francis out to appear in a stage production of The Mission Play in Alhambra, California, which she starred in for three years under directors John S. McGroarty and Tyrone Power Sr.

Francis toured the opera circuit in Italy in the late-1920s through the early-1930s, appearing as the lead soprano in productions of La bohème, Faust, Madama Butterfly, and Pagliacci.

1934–1968: Later life and teaching
After returning to the United States in 1934, Francis married Nelson Kenneth Fields, a United States Forest Service ranger, and resided with him on a berry farm west of Sandy, Oregon. She spent her later life teaching singing in Portland and in her private home studio, known by some locals as "The Little Milan." She was an advocate of the arts in the Portland area, and was a member of various local musical organizations, including the Oregon Music Teachers Association, Progressive Music Teachers, and the Mozart Club. She served as the president of the Sandy Music Club for Oregon Federation of Music Clubs.

Death
Francis died on August 21, 1968, aged 77. Her funeral service was held on August 24, 1968 at Bateman Funeral Parlor in Gresham. She is interred at Lone Fir Cemetery.

Filmography

Stage credits

Notes

References

Sources

External links

1890 births
1968 deaths
Actresses from Portland, Oregon
American expatriates in Italy
American people of Scottish descent
American music educators
American women music educators
American musical theatre actresses
American operatic sopranos
American vocal coaches
American women in business
Dancers from Oregon
Musicians from Portland, Oregon
People from Sandy, Oregon
Singers from Oregon
Vaudeville performers
20th-century American singers
20th-century American women singers
20th-century American dancers
Educators from Oregon
Classical musicians from Oregon
Burials at Lone Fir Cemetery
Oregon Episcopal School alumni